Isla Lagartija, is an island in the Gulf of California off the Baja California Peninsula. The island is uninhabited and is part of the Mexicali Municipality.

Biology

Isla Lagartija has only one species of reptile, the Common Side-blotched Lizard (Uta stansburiana).

References

http://herpatlas.sdnhm.org/places/overview/isla-lagartija/84/1/

Islands of Mexicali Municipality
Islands of Baja California
Islands of the Gulf of California
Uninhabited islands of Mexico